Loathing or loathe may refer to:

 a feeling of disgust or hatred
 Loathe (band), an English heavy metal band
 Loathing (album), a music album by Broken Hope